Clausena smyrelliana, commonly known as Smyrell's clausena or Gregs wampi, is a species of evergreen shrub to 6 m tall, in the family Rutaceae, native to eastern Australia.

References

External links

smyrelliana
Flora of Queensland
Taxa named by Paul Irwin Forster